Xavier Delore (7 August 1828, Fleurie – 20 February 1916, Romanèche-Thorins) was a French surgeon and obstetrician.

In Lyon he served as surgeon-major at Charité Hospital (1859–1872) and associate professor of clinical obstetrics at the Faculty of Medicine and Pharmacy (1877–1886). His name is associated with "Delore's method", defined as a forcible manual procedure for treatment of genu valgum.

Selected works 
With surgeon Antonin Poncet, he was co-author of "Traité de la cystostomie sus-pubienne chez les prostatiques. Création d'un urèthre hypogastrique" (1899). Other works by Delore include:
 Influence de la physiologie moderne sur la médecine pratique, 1864 – Influence of modern physiology towards the practice of medicine.
 Du traitement des ankyloses; examen critique des diverses méthodes, 1864 – On treatment for ankylosis, a critique of diverse methods.
 De l'Hygiène des maternités, discours d'installation prononcé, 1866 - On maternal hygiene.
 De la ventilation des hôpitaux, 1868 - Airing hospitals.
 De la Fonction du nouvel urètre (urètre hypogastrique) chez les prostatiques anciennement cystostomisés, 1897 – Function of the hypogastric ureter, etc.
 La tuberculose génitale chez l'homme et chez la femme, 1920 – Genital tuberculosis of men and women.

References 

1828 births
1916 deaths
People from Rhône (department)
French surgeons
French obstetricians
Academic staff of the University of Lyon